Schweninger is a surname. Notable people with the surname include:

 Dietmar Schweninger, Austrian para-alpine skier
 Ernst Schweninger (1850–1924), German physician and naturopath
 Loren Schweninger (born 1942), history professor and author
 Rosa Schweninger (1849–1918), Austrian painter